William Robert Fearon (14 October 1892 – 27 December 1959) was an Irish politician and academic. He was an independent member of Seanad Éireann from 1943 to 1959. He was first elected to the Seanad in 1943 for the Dublin University constituency. He was re-elected at the 1944, 1948, 1951, 1954 and 1957 elections. He died while still in office. William J. E. Jessop won the subsequent by-election.

He was Professor of Biochemistry at Trinity College Dublin.

References

External links
 

1892 births
1959 deaths
Independent members of Seanad Éireann
Members of the 4th Seanad
Members of the 5th Seanad
Members of the 6th Seanad
Members of the 7th Seanad
Members of the 8th Seanad
Members of the 9th Seanad
Academics of Trinity College Dublin
Fellows of Trinity College Dublin
Members of Seanad Éireann for Dublin University